Palmira is a town in Táchira, Venezuela. It is the capital of Guásimos Municipality. It was founded in 1627 by Fernando Saavedra and in 1642 by Captain Luis Sosa Lovera. In 2011, it had a population of 43.236.

References 

Populated places in Táchira
Populated places established in 1627
1627 establishments in the Spanish Empire